The following is a list of the 55 municipalities (comuni) of the Province of Macerata, Marche, Italy.

List

See also
List of municipalities of Italy

References

Macerata